Charles Dylan Wynn (born June 1, 1993) is a professional gridiron football defensive tackle for the Hamilton Tiger-Cats of the Canadian Football League (CFL). He played college football at Oregon State. He was previously a member of the National Football League (NFL) and of the Alliance of American Football (AAF).

High school career
Wynn was a 2 time state champion at De La Salle High School (Concord, California), playing with Terron Ward and Austin Hooper.

College career
He played college football for Oregon State University where he was second-team all-conference.

Professional career

Cleveland Browns
Wynn spent parts of two years with the Cleveland Browns. 2015 was spent on and off the practice squad, and the following season saw Wynn placed on injured reserve prior to preseason play, before being released.

Toronto Argonauts
As a rookie playing for the Toronto Argonauts during the 2017 CFL season, Wynn made 34 tackles and 6 sacks. After receiving consideration for the CFL's Most Outstanding Rookie Award Wynn was named an Eastern All-Star. He was one of three Argos defensive linemen to be named an Eastern All-Star, alongside Cleyon Laing and Victor Butler. Rookie of the Year would eventually go to Wynn's teammate, running back James Wilder Jr. Wynn and the Argonauts finished in 1st place for the CFL East, and went on to win the 105th Grey Cup championship over the Calgary Stampeders 27–24. Wynn had a challenging 2018 season, missing several games with injury and being suspended for one game for a spearing penalty on Edmonton running back C. J. Gable during a week 5 loss. In 11 games, Wynn finished with 30 tackles and 2 sacks.

Arizona Hotshots
When Wynn became a free agent in the CFL on February 12, 2019, he received numerous offers but elected to sign with the Arizona Hotshots of the AAF on February 19. The startup developmental league was in its third week of play at the time of Wynn's signing, with 8 weeks of regular season play remaining. However, the AAF suspended operations after week 8; Wynn was credited with 5 tackles during his time with the league.

Hamilton Tiger-Cats
Wynn signed with the Hamilton Tiger-Cats of the CFL on May 8, 2019. Wynn was part of a ferocious defensive line, putting up career highs; Wynn played in all 18 games, made 44 tackles, and 11 sacks, including a 3 sack performance against the BC Lions in Week 11; his sack dance was a fan favorite throughout the season. Wynn was named a top performer for the month of August, and returned to the divisional All-Star list.

References

External links
 Oregon State bio

American football defensive linemen
Arizona Hotshots players
Toronto Argonauts players
Canadian football defensive linemen
Players of Canadian football from Texas
Oregon State Beavers football players
Cleveland Browns players
Hamilton Tiger-Cats players
Players of American football from Texas
Sportspeople from Arlington, Texas
Living people
1993 births
De La Salle High School (Concord, California) alumni